Todd Landman is a professor of political science and Pro-Vice Chancellor at the University of Nottingham. He is also an academic magician, specializing in mentalism, a member of The Magic Circle, and Visiting Professor of Performance Magic at the University of Huddersfield.

Works

References

Academics of the University of Nottingham
British political scientists
Living people
Year of birth missing (living people)